Collaborator is the sixth studio album by Djam Karet, released in 1994 by HC Productions.

Track listing

Personnel 
Adapted from Collaborator liner notes.

Djam Karet
 Gayle Ellett – 7-string guitar, 24-string steel acoustic guitar, guitar synthesizer, keyboards, sampler, congas, ocean drum, slit drum, talking drum, metal shakers, rainstick, percussion, electronics, production, mixing
 Mike Henderson – electric guitar, keyboards, electronics, slit drum, percussion
 Henry J. Osborne – 6-string bass guitar, keyboards, sampler, congas, metal shakers, electronics, percussion, production, mixing

Additional musicians
 Marc Anderson – sampler, berimbau and percussion (5)
 Jeff Greinke – keyboards, electronics (3, 12)
 Walter Holland – synthesizer (1, 8)
 Loren Nerell – synthesizer (7, 9)
 Steve Roach – Matrix 12 synthesizer, sampler and synthesizer (4, 10)
 Kit Watkins – hule, sampler and synthesizer (2, 7)
 Carl Weingarten – Dobro and electronics (2, 7)
Production and additional personnel
 Roger Seibel – mastering

Release history

References

External links 
 Collaborator at Discogs (list of releases)
 Collaborator at Bandcamp

1994 albums
Djam Karet albums